Devi Khajishvili (Georgian: დევი ხაჯიშვილი) also known as Devi K. is a Georgian actor, musician and model born in Batumi, Georgia on 9 January 1991.

Early life and career
Khajishvili was born to the family of Nodar Khajishvili, the president of the World Shotokan Karate-Do Federation in Georgia and Nana Khajishvili a piano teacher. He is of Georgian descent from his paternal side and Russian, Ukrainian, Spanish and Iranian from his maternal grandparents. Since he was six years old, he trained in Shotokan Karate under his father's mentorship, and later after competing in numerous national and international tournaments, became a two time World Champion and earned his second degree Black Belt. In his late teens, he was recruited by the national Shotokan Karate Team composed of top athletes who traveled the world competing and representing their country. In 2008, he was the youngest person included in a list of the most successful athletes of Georgia.

Additionally, he earned a Black Belt in Judo, placed third in the Men's National Artistic Gymnastics Competition and competed in the 60 m, 100 m and 200 m distances in Georgian National Track and Field meets.

Education
In 2014, Khajishvili graduated from Texas Tech University with a Bachelors in Political Science and moved to Washington D.C. to work for Congressman Beto O'Rourke. While working in Rep. Beto O’Rourke’s office, Devi Khajishvili built ties with multiple high-ranking government officials of his native country, like the former Prime Minister of Georgia Irakli Garibashvili, former Georgian Ambassador to the United States Archil Gegeshidze, and the founder of the Georgian Labour Party Shalva Natelashvili.

Khajishvili then pursued Master of Science in International Affairs and worked as a teaching assistant for undergraduate courses in Public Policy.

Khajishvili speaks five languages; Georgian, Russian, French, Spanish and English.

Film and stage

Khajishvili attended actors' training courses at the Moscow Art Theatre School, where he studied Konstantin Stanislavsky and Michael Chekhov. He was cast in popular local Georgian theater productions and performed as a dancer with the Georgian National Dance Ensemble for seven years, with whom he toured Europe and did shows nationally and internationally. After moving to the United States, he staged numerous dance performances showcasing Georgian culture to Western audiences. His most notable work centered around the play The Knight in the Panther's Skin by Shota Rustaveli. His talent for dancing was later noticed by a Time Warner advertising director who cast him in a commercial for Mercedes Benz where he performed the Tango.

Arts State University of Batumi, Georgia awarded Khajishvili with the certificate for the best acting of the role of Macbeth in the play Macbeth.

Khajishvili's career in the United States took off when he was discovered by well known Los Angeles based photographer Michael Stokes who featured him as a model in one of his books Bare Strength in 2014.  Author Jen Frederick also used one of Michael Stokes photos of Devi Khajishvili as the book cover for her USA Today best selling book Jock Blocked in 2016.  Next Devi Khajishvili moved into acting co-starring with Richard Riehle in the 2017 romantic-comedy You Have a Nice Flight. Due to Khajishvili's martial arts background he was invited to train with Wesley Snipes who helped to educate Khajishvili in stage combat. Khajishvili's talents for action roles led to him being cast as a lead role in a new television pilot Wednesday The Film where he plays the role of a member of an elite team of the Russian Special Forces.  Wednesday The Film has begun filming in Los Angeles and is scheduled to continue with some filming to be done in Georgia.

In 2017, DEL Records a Latin independent entertainment company headquartered in Los Angeles cast Khajishvili as the lead actor in a music video by Los Del Arroyo - Por Si Te Interesa.

Music
Devi K.'s debut EP Album Runaway Train was released on 22 February 2020. Devi K.'s signature vocal style, distinctive guitar playing and cinematic melodies are felt throughout his emotional and relatable ballads about love, family and relationships. Runaway Train, offers compositions that sound like no other artist, style or genre. His theatrical performance of the songs “Holding On,” “Sister,” “Small Town,” “No Playin’ Games” and “Runaway Train”  captivate listeners and demonstrate his ability to convey a deep cannon of emotion. 

The sequel of this album is currently in the works and is projected to release in December of 2020.

References

21st-century male actors from Georgia (country)
Georgian people of Russian descent
Georgian people of Ukrainian descent
Georgian people of Spanish descent
Georgian people of Iranian descent
Living people
1991 births
People from Batumi
Male karateka from Georgia (country)
Male models from Georgia (country)